Translations of the Bible into Celtic languages have been made for hundreds of years.

Brythonic

Breton

Cornish

Welsh

Gaelic

Irish Gaelic

Manx

Scottish Gaelic

Celtic
Celtic